Aroga eldorada is a moth of the family Gelechiidae. It is found in North America, where it has been recorded from California.

The wingspan is 15–16 mm. The forewings are white at the scale bases, but most scales are heavily infused with dark to blackish-fuscous. The area from the base to the fascia has irregular shades of chestnut-brown. The hindwings are grey.

The larvae feed on Artemisia vulgaris .

References

Moths described in 1936
Aroga
Moths of North America